Argyrodes chionus is a species of tangle-web spider that is endemic to Aldabra in the Seychelles. It is found in dry shrubland at sea level. It is threatened by habitat deterioration due to sea level rise.

References

Theridiidae
Endemic fauna of Seychelles
Endangered animals
Spiders of Africa
Spiders described in 1983